Vidya Bal (Devanagari: विद्या बाळ) (c. 12 January 1937 – 30 January 2020) was a Marathi feminist writer/editor from Maharashtra, India. She was a social activist particularly in the area of equalization of the social status of women vis-à-vis men in India.

Biography 
She joined the editorial staff of monthly Stree (स्त्री) in 1964, and then worked from 1983 to 1986 as its full-time editor. After leaving the editorship of Stree, she founded monthly Miloon Saryajani (मिळून सार्‍याजणी) in 1989. The web page http://www.miloonsaryajani.in/ contains her editorial describing her objectives in founding Miloon Saryajani.
The biography Kamlaki and novel Valvantatil Vat are famous.

Vidya Bal fought a legal battle in the High Court of Maharashtra for women getting the right to enter various places of worship. The High Court decided in favour of her Petipa on 1 April 1899.

Literary works
 Sanwad (संवाद)
 Katha Gaurichi (कथा गौरीची)
 Tumachya Majhyasathi (तुमच्या माझ्यासाठी)
 Aparajitanche Nihshwas (अपराजितांचे नि:श्वास)
 Shodh Swatahacha (शोध स्वत:चा)
 Kamalaki (कमलाकी) (Biography)

References

1930s births
2020 deaths
Marathi-language writers
Indian atheists
Year of birth uncertain
Indian feminist writers
Indian women journalists
20th-century Indian journalists
20th-century Indian women writers
21st-century Indian journalists
21st-century Indian women writers
21st-century Indian writers